MTV Party To Go Volume 8 was the eighth album in the MTV Party To Go series.  The album was certified gold on February 23, 1996 by the RIAA.

Track listing
 "Big Poppa" (Original Version) – The Notorious B.I.G.
 "Feel Me Flow" (Original Mix) – Naughty by Nature
 "If You Love Me" (LP Version) – Brownstone
 "I'll Be There for You/You're All I Need to Get By" (Puff Daddy Mix) – Method Man and Mary J. Blige
 "I Wish" (LP Version) – Skee-Lo
 "Can't Cry Anymore" (LP Version) – Sheryl Crow
 "Rhythm of the Night" (R.X.B. Euro Mix) – Corona
 "Bounce It Y'All" (Original Mix) – DJ Kizzy Rock
 "1st of tha Month" (LP Version) – Bone Thugs-N-Harmony
 "Gangsta's Paradise" (LP Version) – Coolio featuring L.V.
 "Boombastic" (Sting Remix) – Shaggy

Charts

Weekly charts

Year-end charts

References

MTV series albums
1995 compilation albums
Tommy Boy Records compilation albums
Dance-pop compilation albums